Javet is a French surname. Notable people with the surname include:

 Françoise Javet (1922–2008), French film editor
 Charles Georges Javet (1802–1882), French entomologist

See also
 Javert
 Javits
 Javitz

French-language surnames